Gayle Marie LaJaunie Bird Benson (born January 26, 1947) is an American billionaire, businesswoman and sports franchise owner.

Following the death of her husband, Tom Benson, she became principal owner of the New Orleans Saints of the National Football League (NFL) and the New Orleans Pelicans of the National Basketball Association (NBA) in 2018.

Benson is the first woman to be the majority shareholder of the voting stock in both an NFL and NBA franchise.

Early life
She was born Gayle Marie LaJaunie, the daughter of Francis J. LaJaunie (January 5, 1924 – July 18, 2010), and Marie Folse LaJaunie (1924 – May 30, 2010).

She grew up in Algiers, New Orleans, and attended St. Joseph, St. Anthony and Holy Name of Mary schools. She graduated from Martin Behrman High School in 1966.

Career

Early career
Benson began her career in receptionist and secretarial positions while doing interior design before buying and renovating businesses with her second husband, Thomas "T-Bird" Bird. Following their divorce, Benson continued an interior decorating business called Gayle Bird Interiors, Ltd.

In the first ten years, Gayle and her then-husband Thomas Bird, renovated one hundred properties.

New Orleans Saints and New Orleans Pelicans
Benson became the owner of both the Saints and Pelicans following the death of her husband Tom.

Benson is one of ten female NFL owners, including Sheila Ford Hamp (Detroit Lions), Kim Pegula (Buffalo Bills), Carol Davis (Oakland Raiders), Denise DeBartolo York (San Francisco 49ers), Amy Adams Strunk (Tennessee Titans), Virginia Halas McCaskey (Chicago Bears),  Janice McNair (Houston Texans), Jody Allen (Seattle Seahawks), and Dee Haslam (Cleveland Browns).

Tom Benson had planned on bequeathing the voting stock shares of the New Orleans Saints and New Orleans Pelicans to his daughter Renee Benson, grandson Ryan Benson LeBlanc, and granddaughter Rita Benson LeBlanc.

On December 27, 2014, Tom Benson wrote an e-mail to his daughter and two grandchildren stating he wanted "no further contact with any of you." Gayle Benson was named his heir.

Tom Benson's daughter and grandchildren filed lawsuits challenging his decision to name Gayle his heir, questioning his mental competency.

Tom Benson was determined to be mentally competent and was allowed to change his will to leave ownership of the New Orleans Saints and the New Orleans Pelicans to his wife.

Labor complaints 

Rodney Henry, former personal assistant to Tom Benson, filed a lawsuit accusing the New Orleans Saints and Gayle Benson of racism and violations of federal labor laws. The lawsuit claimed that Gayle Benson had treated him with disrespect because of his race. An NFL arbitrator ruled in favor of Henry and against the Saints on the labor complaint, awarding him overtime pay, a contractual payout for his dismissal, and attorney's fees; however, the same arbitrator ruled against Henry on the claims of racism.

Dixie Brewing Company, LLC
In July 2017, it was announced that Tom and Gayle Benson had finalized an agreement to buy a majority share of Dixie Brewing Co. The company's brewery plant had been damaged and closed after Hurricane Katrina. On August 7, 2018, Benson announced, with New Orleans Mayor LaToya Cantrell, that Dixie Brewery would open a distribution center at the old MacFrugal's Distribution Center in New Orleans East.

Thoroughbred Racing 

G M B Racing is the thoroughbred racing stable of Gayle Benson, who owned 2016 Kentucky Derby starters Mo Tom and Tom's Ready and owned 2018 contender Lone Sailor. Tom's Ready was a fine sprinter in mid-2016, winning both the Grade 2 Woody Stephens Stakes at Belmont Park and the Ack Ack Stakes at Churchill Downs.

Personal life
Benson has been married three times. Her first marriage was to Nace Anthony Salomone, on April 8, 1967, which ended in a divorce and annulment in 1972. Her second marriage was to Thomas "T-Bird" Bird, on February 14, 1977, in South Pass, Plaquemines Parish, Louisiana, which ended in a divorce on June 25, 1987.

Gayle's third marriage was to Tom Benson, on October 29, 2004, in San Antonio, Texas. They met at St. Louis Cathedral in New Orleans at a mass. They were married until his death in 2018.

On October 22, 2014, Gayle Benson and her husband commemorated their tenth anniversary by renewing their wedding vows at St. Louis Cathedral.

Philanthropy
While married, Gayle and Tom Benson funded the construction of the Gayle and Tom Benson Stadium at the University of the Incarnate Word in San Antonio, which opened on campus on September 1, 2008.

In January 2012, Benson and her husband were awarded the Pro Ecclesia et Pontifice for their service to Catholic Church by Pope Benedict XVI.

In November 2012, Gayle Benson and her husband, Tom, donated $7.5 million towards the construction of Tulane University's Yulman Stadium. The playing surface is known as Benson Field.

In 2015, the Benson family gave $20 million for cancer care and research.

In February 2019, the Gayle and Tom Benson Charitable Trust donated $5 million to Jesuit High School.

In March 2019, the Gayle and Tom Benson Charitable Trust donated $3.5 million to Second Harvest

In September 2019, the Gayle and Tom Benson Charitable Trust donated $1 million to the campaign of Children's of Mississippi to build a playground at the University of Mississippi Medical Center.

References

References Continued
^ 
 
 
 
 
 
 
 
 
^ 
 
 
 
 
 
 
 

1947 births
Living people
American sports businesspeople
American women philanthropists
American billionaires
Female billionaires
National Basketball Association owners
Women National Football League executives
Women sports owners
New Orleans Pelicans executives
American racehorse owners and breeders
New Orleans Saints owners